Sri Venkateswara Matriculation and Higher Secondary School is a school in Thalaivasal Post, Attur, Salem district, Tamil Nadu, India. It was established in 1995.

High schools and secondary schools in Tamil Nadu
Education in Salem district
Educational institutions established in 1995
1995 establishments in Tamil Nadu